Vasoactive intestinal peptide receptor 2 also known as VPAC2, is a G-protein coupled receptor that in humans is encoded by the VIPR2 gene.

Tissue distribution 
VIPR2 is expressed in the uterus, prostate, smooth muscle of the gastrointestinal tract, seminal vesicles and skin, blood vessels and thymus. VIPR2 is also expressed in the cerebellum.

Function 
Vasoactive intestinal peptide (VIP) and pituitary adenylate cyclase activating polypeptide (PACAP) are homologous peptides that function as neurotransmitters and neuroendocrine hormones. While the receptors for VIP (VIRP 1 and 2) and PACAP (ADCYAP1R1) share homology, they differ in their substrate specificities and expression patterns. VIPR2 transduction results in upregulation of adenylate cyclase activity. Furthermore, VIPR2 mediates the anti-inflammatory effects of VIP.

Research using VPAC2 knockout mice implicate it in the function of the circadian clock, growth, basal energy expenditure and male reproduction.

VIPR2 and/or PAC1 receptor activation is involved in cutaneous active vasodilation in humans.

Splice variants may modify the immunoregulatory contributions of the VIP-VIPR2 axis.
 
VIPR2 may contribute to autoregulation and/or coupling within the suprachiasmatic nucleus (SCN) core and to control of the SCN shell.

Clinical significance
VIPR2 may play a role in schizophrenia.

The abnormal expression of VIPR2 messenger RNA in gallbladder tissue may play a role in the formation of gall stones and polyps.

See also
 Vasoactive intestinal peptide receptor
 VIPR1

References

Further reading

External links

G protein-coupled receptors